The Breeders Crown Open Mare Pace is a harness racing event for four-year-old and older Standardbred mare pacers. It is one part of the Breeders Crown annual series of twelve races for both Standardbred trotters and trotters. First run in 1986, it is contested over a distance of one mile. Race organizers have awarded the event to various racetracks across North America. The 2017 race will be held at Hoosier Park in Anderson, Indiana, United States.

Historical race events
In 2010, Pocono Downs became the first venue to host all 12 events on a single night.

North American Locations
Meadowlands Racetrack (Mxx) New Jersey (13)
Mohawk Raceway (Moh) Ontario (5)
Woodbine Racetrack (Wdb) Ontario (4)
Pompano Park (Ppk) Florida (1)
Pocono Downs (Pcd) Pennsylvania (2)
Freehold Raceway (Fhl) New Jersey (1)
Northfield Park (Nfl) Ohio (2)
The Meadows Racetrack (Mea) Pennsylvania (1)
The Red Mile (Lex) Kentucky (1)
Greenwood Raceway (Grd) Ontario (1)

Records
 Most wins by a horse
 2 – *Shady Daisy (1992, 1994), Eternal Camnation (2001, 2003), Androvette (2011, 2012), Shelliscape (2013, 2014)

 Most wins by a driver
 5 – John Campbell (1987, 1996, 1997, 1998, 2014)

 Most wins by a trainer
 3 – Paul J. Fraley (2012, 013, 2014)

 Stakes record
 1:48 4/5 – Hana Hanover (2009) (equaled World Record) Race video

Winners of the Breeders Crown Open Mare Pace

See also
List of Breeders Crown Winners

References

Recurring sporting events established in 1986
Harness racing in the United States
Harness racing in Canada
Breeders Crown
Racing series for horses
Horse races in Florida
Horse races in Kentucky
Horse races in New Jersey
Horse races in Ohio
Horse races in Ontario
Horse races in Pennsylvania